Phoenix was a fourth rate of the Kingdom of England. Her initial commission was in the Parliamentary Naval Force during the English Civil War. During the Anglo-Dutch War she was taken by the Dutch at the Battle of Montecristo. She was recaptured during the Battle of Leghorn by a boat attack. Recommissioned she participated in the Battle of Sheveningen. She went to the Mediterranean in 1658 and remained there until wrecked in December 1664.

Phoenix was the third named vessel since it was used for a 20-gun ship, purchased in 1545, rebuilt in 1558 and sold in 1573.

Construction and specifications
She was built at Woolwich Dockyard on the River Thames under the guidance of Master Shipwright Peter Pett II. She was launched in 1647. Her builder's measure tonnage was calculated as  tons. Initially she was equipped with 38 guns in wartime and 32 guns in peacetime. In 1664 she carried 40 guns in wartime and 32 in peacetime. Her manning was 150 personnel in 1652 and rose to 160 a year later. By 1660 her manning had dropped to 130 personnel.

Commissioned service

Service in the English Civil War and Commonwealth Navy
She was commissioned into the Parliamentary Naval Force under the command of Captain Owen Cox. She was with Warwick's Fleet in the Downs in September 1648. In 1649 she was under Captain Thomas Harrison for service in the Irish Sea.In 1650 she was under Captain William Brandley sailing with Popham's squadron off the Tagus she later joined Robert Blake's Squadron. Later in 1650 she was under Captain John Wadsworth as Flagship for Robert Blake in the Irish Sea followed by the Isle of Scilly in June 1651 followed by the Channel Islands in October. She sailed with Badiley's Squadron to the Mediterranean. Phoenix was captured by the 40-gun Dutch ship Eendracht off Elba in the Mediterranean during the Battle of Montecristo, 28-8-1652 (O.S.)/6-9-1652 (N.S.), an action between the English squadron commanded by Richard Badiley and a Dutch squadron under Jan van Galen. She was retaken on 26 November 1652 by an attack by English small boats at Leghorn. She recommissioned under Captain Owen Cox again. She was in the Battle off Leghorne on 4 March 1653. She followed this with the Battle of Sceveningen on 31 July 1652. Later in 1653 Captain Nicholas Foster took command and spent the winter of 1653/54 in the sound. During 1656 to 1658 she was under the command of Captain Thomas Whetstone with Blake's Fleet. She returned home between July and November 1656. In 1658/59 she was under Captain Thomas Bunn sailing with Stoake's squadron in the Mediterranean.

Service after the Restoration May 1660
In 1660 Captain Edward Nixon was in command. On 30 April 1663 she was under Captain Richard Utbar. On 16 September 1664 she was under the command of John Chicheley with Allin's squadron in the Mediterranean.

Loss
She was wrecked on 3 December 1664 during a storm in Gibraltar Bay while attempting to pass through the Straits of Gibraltar.

Citations

References

 British Warships in the Age of Sail (1603 – 1714), by Rif Winfield, published by Seaforth Publishing, England © Rif Winfield 2009, EPUB , Chapter 4 Fourth Rates - 'Small Ships', Vessels acquired from 25 March 1603, 1647 Programme Group, Phoenix
 Colledge, Ships of the Royal Navy, by J.J. Colledge, revised and updated by Lt-Cdr Ben Warlow and Steve Bush, published by Seaforth Publishing, Barnsley, Great Britain, © the estate of J.J. Colledge, Ben Warlow and Steve Bush 2020, EPUB , Section P (Phoenix)

Ships of the line of the Royal Navy
Ships built in Woolwich
Shipwrecks in the Mediterranean Sea
1640s ships
Maritime incidents in 1664
Captured ships
Ships of the English navy